Tanzania–Vietnam relations are bilateral relations between Tanzania and Vietnam. Vietnam and Tanzania set up diplomatic relations in 1965. Vietnam maintains an embassy in Dar es Salaam which is mandated to serve all of East Africa. Tanzania does not have an embassy in Vietnam, and the embassy in Beijing is accredited to Vietnam.

Economic Relations 

Trade volume between the two countries in 2014 was around $156 million, with Vietnam exporting over $105 million worth of goods to Tanzania. Main exports from Vietnam to Tanzania include cement clinker and rice. Tanzania is the second largest buyer of Vietnamese rice after Philippines.

In 2015, the trade volume between the two countries rose to $205 million with the rise in exports from Tanzania. Vietnam is the second largest buyer of Tanzanian cashew nuts and third largest buyer of raw cotton.

Foreign direct investment 
Halotel is currently the only Vietnamese firm operating in Tanzania with a $700 million initial investment. The state owned firm promised to provide telecom services in rural areas and was granted an operating licence when president Kikwete made a state visit to Vietnam in 2014.

Along with the president Trương Tấn Sang in March 2016, various Vietnamese businessmen accompanied the president to examine the investment atmosphere in Tanzania. The investors examined the special export processing zones in Tanzania and hope to make Tanzania a gateway for Vietnamese products into East Africa.

State Visits 
 12 October 2014 - President Jakaya Kikwete makes a two-day state visit to Hanoi. The president visits various industries and encourages Vietnamese investment in Tanzania. The president also grants a licence to Viettel Mobile to operate in Tanzania.
 9 March 2016 - President Truong Tan Sang makes a three-day state visit to Tanzania and held bilateral talks with president John Magufuli. Various trade and investment agreements were signed.

References

External links 

 
Vietnam
Bilateral relations of Vietnam